Jorge Basadre Province is one of four provinces in the Tacna Region in southern Peru. Its capital is Locumba. The province was created on April 21, 1988 (by law No. 24799) and is named after Jorge Basadre Grohmann, the country's most notable historian.

Boundaries
North: Moquegua Region
East: Candarave Province
South: Tacna Province
West: Pacific Ocean

Political division
The province is divided into three districts, each of which is headed by a mayor (alcalde):

Ilabaya (Ilabaya)
Ite (Ite)
Locumba (Locumba)

Ethnic groups 
The province is inhabited by indigenous citizens of Aymara and Quechua descent. Spanish, however, is the language which the majority of the population (79.88%) learnt to speak in childhood, 15.90% of the residents started speaking using the Aymara language and 4.01% using Quechua (2007 Peru Census).

References

External links
  Official Municipal website

Provinces of the Tacna Region